Berwick Street is a street in the Soho district of the City of Westminster built between 1687 and 1703. Berwick Street runs between Oxford Street to the north and Peter Street at the south.

History
Berwick Street was built between 1687 and 1703. The Green Man public house has been at No. 57 since 1738. The market was established in the 18th century, though it was not officially recognized until 1892, making it one of the oldest markets in London.

Berwick Street Market
Berwick Street Market is a small outdoor general retail market on Berwick Street in the heart of Soho, London, selling fruit and vegetables, hot food, fish, clothing, accessories, household goods, luggage, jewelry and general goods.

It is open Monday to Saturday from 8 am until 6 pm.

Description

In addition to the market, there are many shops and restaurants along the street, including some pubs, delis, cafés, record stores, vintage shops, clothing shops, hairdressers, bike shops and fabric shops. 

Popular eating and drinking locations include traditional London pub The Blue Posts, Ember Yard and Poletti, dim sum restaurant Yauatcha, and Alan Yau's Chinese pub concept Duck & Rice. Diverse café style dining is also available with quirky independents Foxcroft & Ginger, Flat White and Damson & Co.

Synonymous with the fashion & textile industry, Berwick Street offer a diverse mix of independent, international and vintage fashion stores including denim brand Nudie Jeans, Underground shoes, British menswear brands Percival, Universal Works and Oliver Spencer, as well as cult stores Supreme and Foo patrol and high-profile tailor Chris Kerr.

Fabric shops can also be found, including three stores from Misan Fabric, The Cloth House, The Silk Society and Borowiecki Fabrics.

Berwick Street mixes the old and the new with independent concepts including one stop cycle shop and café Soho Bikes, hair salon Bleach, antiques and vintage shop Absolute Vintage, Gosh comics and quality art material store Cass Art.

Berwick Street is well known for its independent record shops, especially through the 1990s into the early 21st century (including Phonica records, Reckless Records, Sounds of The Universe, Sister Ray, and Mr Bongo's), however many have closed due to the emergence of digital downloading. The street is also home to a variety of studios and advertising firms, including Berwick Post, Silk Sound, Vivid London, Street Furniture and Felt Music.

There is a cabaret venue, The Box Soho (on the site of the former Raymond Revuebar), and some smaller restaurants and bars. The street is crossed by Peter Street, Broadwick Street, D'Arblay Street and Noel Street.

The cover photograph of Oasis' second album (What's the Story) Morning Glory? was taken at Berwick Street.

The nearest London Underground stations are Piccadilly Circus, Oxford Circus, Tottenham Court Road and Leicester Square.

In 2005 Westminster City Council's Corporate Property Department presented a planning application, known internally as Project Fox, to redevelop the west side of Berwick Street Market, against local opposition. At a hearing on 28 July 2005, the Planning and City Development Committee refused planning permission for the application and the scheme was eventually withdrawn entirely, following which the Berwick Street Planning Brief was drawn up by the Council's Planning Department in consultation with local stakeholders.

In November 2012 it was announced that PMB Holdings, a property company chaired by Peter Beckwith, had acquired the rights for the regeneration of the historic fruit market in Berwick Street and a row of 12 shops and offices. The agreement came more than a year after PMB was selected as preferred bidder, beating local landlords Soho Estates and Shaftesbury, and Henderson Global Investors, among others, to the deal.

References
Citations

Sources

External links

Retail markets in London
Streets in Soho
Soho, London